Georgi Nikolayevich Vasilyev (25 November 1899 – 18 June 1946) was a Soviet and Russian film director, screenwriter and actor. From 1928 to 1943, together with Sergei Vasilyev (often jointly, though incorrectly credited as Vasilyev brothers), he co-directed several films, including an influential and critically acclaimed Chapaev (1934). Georgi Vasilyev received two Stalin Prizes in 1941 and 1942.

Filmography

Honors and awards
 Honored Art Worker of the RSFSR (1940)
 Stalin Prize:
first class (1941) – for Chapaev
first class (1942) – for the 1st series of The Defense of Tsaritsyn
 Order of Lenin (1935) – for Chapaev
 Order of the Red Star (1944)
 Medal "For Valiant Labour in the Great Patriotic War 1941–1945" (1945)

External links

1899 births
1946 deaths
People from Vologda
People from Vologodsky Uyezd
Male screenwriters
Russian film directors
Russian film editors
Russian male film actors
20th-century Russian screenwriters
20th-century Russian male writers
Soviet film directors
Soviet film editors
Soviet male film actors
Soviet screenwriters
20th-century Russian male actors
Stalin Prize winners
Recipients of the Order of Lenin
Recipients of the Order of the Red Star
Tuberculosis deaths in Slovenia
20th-century deaths from tuberculosis
Burials at Novodevichy Cemetery
Residents of the Benois House